Mack Gray (December 11, 1905, Brooklyn, New York – January 17, 1981, Beverly Hills, California) was an American actor who was the brother of Joe Gray (actor) and great-uncle of Jon Abrahams. 

He was given the nickname "Killer" by Carole Lombard due to his roles in films as a tough guy. Longtime friend and confidant of George Raft, Dean Martin, and Frank Sinatra, who often cast him in their films.(1) (2). Gray was a close associate of Dean Martin for close to 35 years. (2)

Selected filmography

 Applause (1929).... as Slim's Brother
 Goin' to Town (1935).... as Croupier
 The Glass Key (1935).... as Duke
 The House Across the Bay (1940).... as Doorman/Lookout
 Diamond Horseshoe (1945).... as Mack, the Waiter
 Nocturne (1946) .... as Gratz
 Race Street (1948) .... as Stringy
 Take Me Out to the Ball Game (1949).... as Gangster Henchman
 A Dangerous Profession (1949).... as Fred, the Taxi Driver
 Wabash Avenue (1950).... as Poker Player
 Rhubarb (1951).... as Suspect in Polo-coat in Line-up
 Love Nest (1951).... as Man in Jail
 Ten Thousand Bedrooms (1957).... as Party Guest
 Sergeants 3 (1962).... as Bartender
 Who's Got the Action? (1962).... as Hood

References

 Martin, Ricci  That's Amore: A Son Remembers Dean Martin Taylor Trade Publishing 2001 
 Tosches, Nick   Dino: Living High in the Dirty Business of Dreams Doubleday Books 1992 
Wallace, Stone George Raft - The Man Who Would Be Bogart. Smashworlds Edition. 2015

External links
 

1905 births
1981 deaths
People from Brooklyn
American male film actors
20th-century American male actors